Jidr-El Mouhguen  or Jedr El Moubghuen is a town and urban commune in the Trarza Region of south-western Mauritania.

In 2000 it had a population of 6,632.

References

Communes of Trarza Region